The 2023 EFL Trophy, known as the Papa Johns Trophy for sponsorship reasons, the 40th season in the history of the competition, is a knock-out tournament for clubs in EFL League One and League Two, the third and fourth tiers of the English football league system, as well as the "Academy teams" of 16 Premier League clubs with Category One status.

Route to the final

Plymouth Argyle

Bolton Wanderers

Group B

Match

References

2023
Events at Wembley Stadium
2023 Trophy Final
EFL Trophy Final
Efl Trophy Final 2023
Football League Trophy Final 2023
Football League Trophy Final 2023
EFL Trophy